Terry McKenna (born 30 April 1964) is a New Zealand cricketer. He played in twelve first-class and five List A matches for Central Districts from 1987 to 1990.

See also
 List of Central Districts representative cricketers

References

External links
 

1964 births
Living people
New Zealand cricketers
Central Districts cricketers
Cricketers from Lower Hutt